Tomi Pallassalo (born 17 August 1989 in Helsinki, Finland) is a Finnish professional ice hockey forward currently playing for Jokerit in Finnish SM-liiga

References
http://www.sm-liiga.fi/pelaajat/09-10/jokerit/pallassalo-tomi/ura.html#tabs

1989 births
Finnish ice hockey forwards
Living people
Ice hockey people from Helsinki